Each winner of the 1966 Governor General's Awards for Literary Merit was selected by a panel of judges administered by the Canada Council for the Arts.

Winners

English Language
Fiction: Margaret Laurence, A Jest of God
Poetry or Drama: Margaret Atwood, The Circle Game
Non-Fiction: George Woodcock, The Crystal Spirit: A Study of George Orwell

French Language
Fiction: Claire Martin, La joue droite.
Poetry or Drama: Réjean Ducharme, L'avalée des avalés.
Non-Fiction: Marcel Trudel, Le comptoir, 1604–1627.

Governor General's Awards
Governor General's Awards
Governor General's Awards